Hussein Ahmed Salah is a Djiboutian former long-distance runner, best known for winning a bronze medal in the marathon at the 1988 Summer Olympics. He also won silver medals in this event at the 1987 and 1991 World Championships. In addition, he won the 1985 IAAF World Marathon Cup.  He also came second in the New York Marathon in 1985, and won the Paris Marathon in 1986.

His personal best time was 2:07:07, achieved in a 2nd-place finish in the Rotterdam Marathon in April 1988. He and race winner Belayneh Densamo both ran faster than Carlos Lopes' World Record of 2:07:12, set on the Rotterdam course in 1985. Salah's 2:07:07 is the current national record for Djibouti. He also holds the national record in 10,000 metres with 28:17.4 minutes. He is the only Djiboutian athlete to win an Olympic medal.

International competitions

Road races

References

External links
 
 
 

1956 births
Living people
People from Ali Sabieh Region
Djiboutian male marathon runners
Djiboutian male long-distance runners
Olympic athletes of Djibouti
Olympic bronze medalists for Djibouti
Olympic bronze medalists in athletics (track and field)
Athletes (track and field) at the 1984 Summer Olympics
Athletes (track and field) at the 1988 Summer Olympics
Athletes (track and field) at the 1992 Summer Olympics
Athletes (track and field) at the 1996 Summer Olympics
Medalists at the 1988 Summer Olympics
World Athletics Championships athletes for Djibouti
World Athletics Championships medalists
Paris Marathon male winners
Djiboutian male cross country runners